The 2011 Incarnate Word Cardinals football team represented the University of the Incarnate Word in the 2011 NCAA Division II football season. Home games were played at Gayle and Tom Benson Stadium. They finished the season 2–9, 1–7 in Lone Star play to finish in a tie for sixth place.

Previous season
The Cardinals finished the 2010 season with a record of 3–8, 2–6 in Lone Star Conference play.

Schedule

References

Incarnate Word
Incarnate Word Cardinals football seasons
Incarnate Word Cardinals football